Theodore Theodoridis (born 1 August 1965 in Athens) is a Greek football official.

Biography 

In March 2016, Theodoridis was appointed interim general secretary of UEFA, as a replacement for Gianni Infantino. This became permanent that September, when current president Aleksander Čeferin was elected. Before becoming general secretary, he was UEFA's deputy general secretary.

Prior to joining UEFA, Theodoridis was a board member of the Hellenic Football Federation (HFF).

References 

1965 births
Living people
Greek football managers
Members of the UEFA Executive Committee
Sportspeople from Athens